Venus is a super yacht designed by Philippe Starck's design company Ubik and built by Feadship for the entrepreneur Steve Jobs at a cost of €105 million. Jobs died in October 2011, a year before the yacht was unveiled.

History
Venus was unveiled 28 October 2012 at the Feadship shipyard. The yacht was named for the Roman goddess of love.

The yacht was impounded 21 December 2012 at the Port of Amsterdam following a payment dispute: Starck claimed Jobs' heirs owed him €3 million of his €9 million fee for the project.  The dispute was resolved after a few days.

See also 
 List of motor yachts by length
 List of yachts built by Feadship

References

2012 ships
Motor yachts
Individual yachts
Experimental ships
Ships built in the Netherlands
Steve Jobs